Buttock cells are cells having a notched appearance that are found in certain malignancies, such as non-Hodgkin's lymphoma (including follicular lymphoma), mycosis fungoides, and Sézary syndrome.

See also 

 Clue cell
 Koilocyte
 Large cell

References 

Blood cells
Lymphoma